Cyclotopsis is a genus of small sea snails, marine gastropod mollusks in the family Tornidae.

Species
Species within the genus Cyclotopsis include:
 Cyclotopsis beviae Fischer-Piette, Blanc, C.P., Blanc, F. & Salvat, 1993
 Cyclotopsis conoidea (L. Pfeiffer, 1846)
 Cyclotopsis filicum Morelet, 1877
 Cyclotopsis horrida Morelet, 1888
 Cyclotopsis josephinae Emberton, 2003
 Cyclotopsis mermosi Fischer-Piette, Blanc, C.P., Blanc, F. & Salvat, 1993
 Cyclotopsis miaryi Fischer-Piette, Blanc, C.P., Blanc, F. & Salvat, 1993
 Cyclotopsis milloti Fischer-Piette, Blanc, F. & Vukadinovic, 1974
 Cyclotopsis montana (L. Pfeiffer, 1855)
 Cyclotopsis nevilli Morelet, 1877
 Cyclotopsis orchidae Emberton, 2003
 Cyclotopsis semistriata (G. B. Sowerby I, 1842)
 Cyclotopsis spurca (Grateloup, 1840)
 Cyclotopsis subdiscoidea (G. B. Sowerby I, 1850)
 Cyclotopsis trailii (L. Pfeiffer, 1862)
 Cyclotopsis tsaratananae Emberton, 2003

References

External links
 Blanford W. T. (1864). On the classification of the Cyclostomacea of eastern Asia. The Annals and Magazine of Natural History. ser. 3, 13: 441-465

Pomatiidae